Gary Crawford may refer to:

Gary William Crawford (born 1953), American writer
Gary Crawford (politician) (born 1960), Canadian politician
Gary Crawford (actor) in Police Academy (TV series)
Gary Crawford (skier) (born 1957), Olympic skier

See also
Garry Crawford (born 1972), sociologist